The John Abraham Award for Best Malayalam Film is an Indian film award instituted by the Kerala Chapter of the Federation of Film Societies of India in memory of filmmaker John Abraham. The award is given annually since 1998 for the best film in Malayalam.

List of winners

References

Awards for best film
Indian film awards
Malayalam cinema
Kerala awards
1998 establishments in Kerala
Awards established in 1998